The Baltimore Bullet is a 1979 American comedy film based on the adventures of two pool hustlers in the United States.

It was directed by Robert Ellis Miller and starred James Coburn, Omar Sharif, Bruce Boxleitner and Ronee Blakley. The screenplay was written by film and stage dancer John Brascia, from a story by Brascia and Robert Vincent O'Neil.  Brascia also produced the film.

Various real-life notable professional players made cameo appearances, including Lou Butera, Willie Mosconi, Steve Mizerak, Mike Sigel and Jimmy Mataya.

As of January 2009, the film has been released on (now out-of-print) NTSC VHS video tape, and a Region-2 (European, PAL-format) DVD, but is not presently available in other DVD regions.

Plot
Nick Casey, whose nickname is the "Baltimore Bullet," is a legendary pool player whose best days are behind him.  He decides to teach everything he knows to a young up-and-comer, Billie Joe Robbins, all leading up to a big winner-take-all match between Nick and The Deacon (Omar Sharif's character).

Cast
 James Coburn as Nick "The Baltimore Bullet" Casey
 Omar Sharif as "The Deacon"
 Bruce Boxleitner as Billie Joe Robbins
 Ronee Blakley as Carolina Red
 Jack O'Halloran as Max
 Calvin Lockhart as "Snow" White
 Cisse Cameron as Sugar
 Michael Lerner as Paulie
 Rockne Tarkington as Gunner
 Robert Hewes as Ricco
 Shepherd Sanders as Robin Hood
 Paul Barselou as Cosmo
 Lou Wagner as Savannah Shorty
 Shay Duffin as Big Al
 Peter Jason as Bert
 Eric Laneuville as Purvis
 T. J. Castronovo as Ernie
 Ed Bakey as Skinny
 Charlie Picerni as The Dealer
 George Fisher as Cardplayer
 Walter Wyatt as Blindman Joe
 John Alderman as Bookie

External links
 

1979 films
1979 comedy films
American comedy films
Cue sports films
Embassy Pictures films
Films directed by Robert Ellis Miller
Films scored by Johnny Mandel
Films set in New Orleans
Films shot in New Orleans
1980s English-language films
1970s English-language films
1970s American films
1980s American films